Tricholoma sejunctum (colloquially yellow blusher in the eastern regions of North America) is a mushroom that appears across much of the Northern Hemisphere and is associated with pine forests.

Description
The cap is greenish-brownish yellow, slightly moist, and has dark fibrils near the center. The gills and stipe are whitish-yellow. The odor is mild to mealy and the taste mild to unpleasant.

Edibility
There is some confusion as to the certain identification of the species, so it is considered unsafe for eating. While classified as inedible by some field guides, it seems to have been traditionally consumed in much of world without noted ill effects. More recently, in Europe it has been identified as responsible for poisonings.

The species is reportedly consumed in China's Yunnan province, where it is generally known as 荞面菌 (Pinyin: qiao mian jun; lit. 'Buckwheat Noodle Mushroom') on account of this property, despite the fact that its proper name is 黄绿口蘑 (lit. 'Yellow Green Mouth Mushroom').

Similar species
Tricholoma flavovirens is usually larger and fleshier, with more solid yellow gills and stipe and a less fibrillose cap. Other similar species include Tricholoma arvernense, and T. viridilutescens.

See also
List of North American Tricholoma
List of Tricholoma species

References

sejunctum
Fungi described in 1799
Fungi of Asia
Fungi of Europe
Taxa named by James Sowerby